Shine a Light is the second full-length album released by the Constantines, and their first to be released internationally on the Sub Pop record label.  It was the first album to feature keyboard player Will Kidman as a member of the band. The album also features some saxophone assistance from Jonas Berkeley.

Reception

Pitchfork placed Shine a Light at number 172 on its list of top 200 albums of the 2000s. It was nominated for a 2004 Juno Award under the category Alternative Album of the Year.

Track listing
 "National Hum" – 2:49
 "Shine a Light" – 4:47
 "Nighttime Anytime (It's Alright)" – 4:13
 "Insectivora" – 3:56
 "Young Lions" – 3:50
 "Goodbye Baby & Amen" – 4:57
 "On to You" – 4:36
 "Poison" – 3:36
 "Scoundrel Babes" – 2:44
 "Tiger & Crane" – 3:13
 "Tank Commander (Hung Up in a Warehouse Town)" – 4:02
 "Sub-Domestic" – 3:36

References

2003 albums
Constantines albums
Sub Pop albums
Three Gut Records albums